Florentin Matei (born 15 April 1993) is a Romanian professional footballer who plays as an attacking midfielder.

He began his football career at Steaua București, before leaving his native country in 2011 to play for Cesena. He then had spells with Volyn Lutsk and Rijeka, winning two domestic trophies in Croatia with the latter. At the beginning of 2018, Matei returned to Romania on loan with Astra Giurgiu, but then joined Ittihad Kalba in the summer of the same year. After being released by the Emirati side in January 2019, he was resigned by his boyhood club FCSB.

Matei represented Romania at under-17 and under-19 level.

Club career

Steaua București
Born in Bolintin-Vale, Giurgiu County, Matei came through FC Steaua București's youth ranks, and in 2009 he was named the best player of the "Iulian Manzarov – International Football Tournament for Juniors" in Bulgaria. On 16 May 2010 he made his Liga I debut for the senior team, in a 2–0 victory against FC Universitatea Craiova where he came on as a substitute for Romeo Surdu in the 82nd minute; in September, he was sent on loan at fellow league side Unirea Urziceni along with several other teammates from Steaua's reserves.

The following year, Matei terminated his contract with the capital-based club. As a result, Steaua owner George Becali criticised the youngster, stating in a controversial manner that he would never become an above average player.

Cesena
After eight months as a free agent, Matei signed with A.C. Cesena from Italy on 11 September 2011. He was released only a year later.

Volyn Lutsk
In the autumn of 2013, Matei agreed to a three-year deal with Ukrainian side Volyn Lutsk, having been previously close to joining Dinamo București, the historical rival of his former club Steaua. During his spell with "the Crusaders" he made 61 appearances all competitions comprised, and scored 12 goals.

Rijeka
On 2 February 2016, HNK Rijeka announced they had signed Matei on a three-and-a-half-year contract. He was given the number 10 jersey and made his debut a week later, as an 85th-minute substitute in a 2–0 home win over NK Lokomotiva. He scored his first goal for his new team in the first leg of the Croatian Cup semi-final, helping to a 2–1 defeat of Slaven Belupo.

On 9 January 2018, Rijeka loaned Matei to Astra Giurgiu in Romania until the end of the campaign.

Ittihad Kalba
In May 2018, after his loan at Astra Giurgiu expired, he moved to Emirati club Ittihad Kalba for a transfer fee of €500,000. He netted his first goal on 28 September, in a 3–1 victory over Al-Nasr.

Return to FCSB
Matei returned to his boyhood club Steaua București—now renamed FCSB—on 4 January 2019, seven years after stating that he did not regret leaving the Roș-albaștrii and being subsequently criticised by owner Gigi Becali.

Return to Astra Giurgiu
On 19 June 2019 he signed a 1-year contract with Liga I side Astra Giurgiu.

Apollon Smyrnis
On 19 February 2022, Matei's contract with Greek club Apollon Smyrnis was terminated.

International career
Matei earned caps for Romania's under-17 and under-19 teams. In early 2016, Romanian coach Mircea Lucescu regarded him as a player who would deserve to be selected for the full side.

Career statistics

Club

Honours

Club
Rijeka
Prva HNL: 2016–17
Croatian Cup: 2016–17

References

External links
 
 

1993 births
Living people
People from Bolintin-Vale
Romanian footballers
Romania youth international footballers
Association football midfielders
Liga I players
Liga II players
Serie A players
Ukrainian Premier League players
Croatian Football League players
UAE Pro League players
Cypriot First Division players
Super League Greece players
FC Steaua II București players
FC Steaua București players
FC Unirea Urziceni players
A.C. Cesena players
FC Volyn Lutsk players
HNK Rijeka players
FC Astra Giurgiu players
Al-Ittihad Kalba SC players
Apollon Limassol FC players
Apollon Smyrnis F.C. players
FC UTA Arad players
Romanian expatriate footballers
Expatriate footballers in Italy
Expatriate footballers in Ukraine
Expatriate footballers in Croatia
Expatriate footballers in the United Arab Emirates
Expatriate footballers in Cyprus
Expatriate footballers in Greece
Romanian expatriate sportspeople in Italy
Romanian expatriate sportspeople in Ukraine
Romanian expatriate sportspeople in Croatia
Romanian expatriate sportspeople in the United Arab Emirates
Romanian expatriate sportspeople in Cyprus
Romanian expatriate sportspeople in Greece